Freddy Keiaho, born Naivote Taulawakeiaho, (born) December 18, 1982) is a Fijian former professional American football linebacker. He played college football for the San Diego State University Aztecs, and was drafted by the Indianapolis Colts in the third round of the 2006 NFL Draft. He was a part of the Colts' Super Bowl XLI victory against the Chicago Bears. He joined the Jacksonville Jaguars in the 2010 season.

Early life
Keiaho was born Naivote Taulawakeiaho in Suva, Fiji. He grew up in Ventura, California and played high school football for Buena High School, where he was a star athlete. Freddy's older brother, George, was a star running back at Buena High School, rushing for 6,615 yards from 1990 to 1993 before accepting a scholarship to Washington and later attending California Lutheran University. His other older brother, Roger Keiaho, is the lead singer of the rock band Rey Fresco.

Football career
Keiaho attended San Diego State University, where he played for the San Diego State Aztecs football team. He was drafted into the National Football League in 2006, being picked up by the Indianapolis Colts in the third round of the 2006 NFL Draft. As such he became the first Fijian ever drafted into the NFL. He played with the Colts for four seasons, 2006–2009. In 2010, he was signed by the Jacksonville Jaguars.  After spending most of the 2010 season on injured reserve, he was released with an injury settlement in December 2010.

External links
Indianapolis Colts bio
San Diego State Aztecs bio

References

1982 births
Living people
I-Taukei Fijian people
American people of I-Taukei Fijian descent
People from Ventura, California
Sportspeople from Ventura County, California
Players of American football from California
Fijian players of American football
American football linebackers
San Diego State Aztecs football players
Indianapolis Colts players
Jacksonville Jaguars players
Fijian emigrants to the United States
Fijian American